Furlong Creek is a glacial meltwater tributary stream,  long, flowing north from Howard Glacier into Delta Stream in Taylor Valley, Victoria Land, Antarctica. Spaulding Pond lies along this watercourse. The name was suggested by Diane McKnight, leader of a United States Geological Survey team which made extensive studies of the hydrology and geochemistry of streams and ponds in the Lake Fryxell basin, 1987–94. It was named after hydrologist Edward Furlong, a member of the field team that established stream gauging stations on streams flowing into Lake Fryxell in the 1990–91 season.

References

Rivers of Victoria Land
McMurdo Dry Valleys